Al-Hussein Gambour (born 21 August 1989 in Tripoli) is a Libyan rower. He placed 32nd in the men's single sculls event at the 2016 Summer Olympics.

He competed in the men's single sculls event at the 2020 Summer Olympics.

References

External links
 
 
 

1989 births
Living people
Libyan male rowers
Olympic rowers of Libya
Rowers at the 2016 Summer Olympics
Rowers at the 2020 Summer Olympics